Carlia rhomboidalis, the blue-throated rainbow-skink, is a species of skink in the genus Carlia. It is endemic to Queensland, Australia.

References

Carlia
Reptiles described in 1869
Endemic fauna of Australia
Skinks of Australia
Taxa named by Wilhelm Peters